The Advance Epsilon is a family of Swiss single-place paragliders, designed and produced by Advance Thun of Thun.

Design and development
The Epsilon was designed as a basic-intermediate glider intended for thermalling flight.

The design has progressed through nine generations of models, the Epsilon, Epsilon 2, 3, 4, 5, 6, 7, 8 and 9 each improving on the last. The models are each named for their rough wing area in square metres.

Variants
Epsilon 4 24
Small-sized model for lighter pilots. The glider model is DHV 1-2 certified.
Epsilon 4 26
Mid-sized model for medium-weight pilots. The glider model is DHV 1-2 certified.
Epsilon 4 28
Large-sized model for heavier pilots. The glider model is DHV 1-2 certified.
Epsilon 4 31
Extra large-sized model for heavier pilots. The glider model is DHV 1-2 certified.
Epsilon 5 23
Small-sized model for lighter pilots. The glider has a glide ratio of 8.7:1.
Epsilon 5 25
Mid-sized model for medium-weight pilots. The glider has a glide ratio of 8.7:1.
Epsilon 5 28
Large-sized model for heavier pilots. The glider has a glide ratio of 8.7:1.
Epsilon 5 31
Extra large-sized model for heavier pilots. The glider has a glide ratio of 8.7:1.
Epsilon 6 23
Small-sized model for lighter pilots. The glider model is EN/LTF B certified.
Epsilon 6 26
Mid-sized model for medium-weight pilots. The glider model is EN/LTF B certified.
Epsilon 6 28
Large-sized model for heavier pilots. The glider model is EN/LTF B certified.
Epsilon 6 31
Extra large-sized model for heavier pilots. Its wing has an area of and the aspect ratio is 5.25:1. The glider model is EN/LTF B certified.
Epsilon 7 23
Small-sized model for lighter pilots. The glider model is EN/LTF B certified.
Epsilon 7 26
Mid-sized model for medium-weight pilots. The glider model is EN/LTF B certified.
Epsilon 7 28
Large-sized model for heavier pilots. The glider model is EN/LTF B certified.
Epsilon 7 30
Extra large-sized model for heavier pilots. Its wing has an area of and the aspect ratio is 5.15:1. The glider model is EN/LTF B certified.
Epsilon 8 23
Small-sized model for lighter pilots. The glider model is EN/LTF B certified.
Epsilon 8 25
Mid-sized model for medium-weight pilots. The glider model is EN/LTF B certified.
Epsilon 8 27
Large-sized model for heavier pilots. The glider model is EN/LTF B certified.
Epsilon 8 29
Extra large-sized model for heavier pilots. The glider model is EN/LTF B certified.
Epsilon 9 22 
Small-sized model for lighter pilots. The glider model is EN/LTF B certified.
Epsilon 9 24
Mid-sized model for medium-weight pilots. The glider model is EN/LTF B certified.
Epsilon 9 26
Mid-sized model for medium-weight pilots. The glider model is EN/LTF B certified.
Epsilon 9 28
Large-sized model for heavier pilots. The glider model is EN/LTF B certified.
Epsilon 9 30
Extra large-sized model for heavier pilots. The glider model is EN/LTF B certified.

Specifications (Epsilon 4 24)

References

External links

Epsilon
Paragliders